La Molina may refer to:
 La Molina (ski resort), ski resort in Catalonia, Spain
 La Molina District, district of Lima Province, Peru

See also 
 Molina (disambiguation)